Stevens Point Brewery is a regional American brewery located in Stevens Point, Wisconsin. The brewery is the fifth-oldest continuously operating brewery and the third-oldest privately owned brewery in the nation.

The company's sales volume among all breweries in the nation increased from 50th in 2009 to 32nd in 2015. Among craft breweries, the company's sales volume ranks 25th in the nation as of 2015.

The brewer has won awards several times including the category for American-style amber three times for their Point Amber Classic brand (Gold in 1996; Silver in 2002; Gold in 2012), and three times in the Schwarzbier category for their Point 2012 Black Ale (Silver in 2011; Silver in 2012; Gold in 2013). The brewer has also won awards for other brands in its portfolio.

History
The company was founded in 1857 by George Ruder and Frank Wahle. In 1864, the company provided its beer to the troops during the American Civil War. The brewery was subsequently sold to Andrew and Jacob Lutz in 1867. The Lutz family continued operations until it was sold to Gustav Kuenzel in 1897. The company was then organized as the Gustav Kuenzel Brewing Company in 1901. The following year, it was renamed the Stevens Point Brewing Company. Ludwig Korfman purchased a controlling interest in the company in 1924 and reorganized the company as the Stevens Point Beverage Company. The company faced local competition from the mid-1860s through the Prohibition era of the 1920s, when the remaining competition went out of business. During the 1950s, the brewery began using cans in production. In 1973, Point Special brand beer was rated the top American beer in a taste test as reported by Mike Royko, a prominent columnist for the Chicago Daily News. By the 1970s the company was owned by Felix and Ken Shibilski. In 1990, the company first began selling its product outside Wisconsin, in Illinois, Indiana, Michigan, and Minnesota. In 1992, the Shibilskis sold the company to Chicago-based Barton Beers Ltd. The new ownership was unique for Barton in that Point beer was its only domestic product line, with all of its other offerings being imports. The company planned to tie sales to its Mexican brand, Corona, but when that brand's sales exploded, the Point brand became a distraction. In 2002, the company was sold back to Wisconsin ownership by Milwaukee-based real estate developers Joe Martino and Jim Wiechmann. That same year, the company introduced gourmet sodas to its beverage list. In 2003, Point Special won the gold medal at the Great American Beer Festival in the premium lager category. In 2005, the company bought four beer brands from the James Page Brewing Company. By 2008, the company's products were distributed to 18 different states. For nearly 20 years, the company brewed and bottled Karl Strauss Brewing Company brands until production was moved in January, 2009. The company expanded its annual brewery capacity to 100,000 barrels in 2011, and to 150,000 barrels in 2013.

Brands

Alcoholic beverages
Point Special Lager
Point Bock Seasonal
Point Amber Classic
Point Cascade Pale Ale
Point Belgian White Wheat Ale
Point Onyx Black Ale 
Point Three Kings Kolsh Style Ale 
Point Nude Beach Summer Wheat 
Point Oktoberfest
Point St. Benedict's Winter Ale
Point Drop Dead Blonde
Point Smiley Blue Pils
Point Beyond the Pale IPA 
Whole Hog Raspberry Saison 
Whole Hog Russian Imperial Stout
Whole Hog Six Hop India Pale Ale (IPA)
Whole Hog Scotch Ale 
Whole Hog Barley Wine Style Ale 
Whole Hog Pumpkin Ale
JP Casper White Stout
JP Yabba Dhabba Chai Tea Porter
JP Ould Sod Irish Red India Pale Ale (IPA)
JP Accapella Gluten-Free Pale Ale
Ciderboys First Press
Ciderboys Magic Apple
Ciderboys Peach County
Ciderboys Raspberry Smash
Ciderboys Cranberry Road
Ciderboys Mad Bark

Baraboo Brewing Company brand beers, produced for Hy-Vee supermarkets.
Woodpecker Wheat
Lumberjack IPA
Red Granite Lager
Snow Drift Black IPA
Bonfire Märzen

Former production
Point Holiday Beer (1935–1940)
Prize Beer (1935–1940)
Big Charlie Beer (1937–1944)
Amber Prize Beer (1939–1950)
Karl Strauss Brewing Company brands (1989–2009)

Gourmet sodas
Point Premium Root Beer
Point Premium Diet Root Beer
Point Premium Vanilla Cream Soda
Point Premium Black Cherry Cream Soda
Point Premium Orange Cream Soda
Point Premium Kitty Cocktail Soda

References

External links
Stevens Point Brewery website

American companies established in 1857
1857 establishments in Wisconsin
Brewery
Beer brewing companies based in Wisconsin
American soft drinks
Food and drink companies established in 1857